Palagianello is a railway station in Palagianello, Italy. The station is located on the Bari–Taranto railway. The train services are operated by Trenitalia.

On 22 June 2008 the station was relocated to a brand new station south east of the town. This was as part of the upgrade of the route between Bari and Taranto. The old alignment of the track is now a cycle way through the centre of Palagianello.

Train services
The station is served by the following service(s):

Local services (Treno regionale) Bari - Gioia del Colle - Taranto

References

Railway stations in Apulia
Buildings and structures in the Province of Taranto
Railway stations opened in 2008